The first competitive rugby league in Sweden was the 2nd annual Scandinavian Nines Tournament, hosted by Spartacus Reds in Gothenburg in April 2010. A domestic league was founded in 2011, initially comprising only three small struggling teams - Borås Ravens, Spartacus Reds and Gothenburg Lions.

Sweden competed in their first rugby league international on 30 October 2010 when they travelled over the border and drew 20 – 20 against Norway. The national team has since played 18 matches, winning five and drawing one.

References

External links